Hyechong also known as Esō was a Buddhist monk from Baekje who travelled to Japan in the Asuka period to transmit Buddhism.

Traveling to Japan in 595 (the 3rd year of Empress Suiko), he preached Buddhism.

References 

Baekje Buddhist monks
Sanron Buddhist monks
Asuka period Buddhist clergy